Monique Alexander is an American pornographic actress, nude model, and 2017 AVN Hall of Fame inductee. Alexander has also been an advocate for free speech and sex education, and has appeared on Fox News and in a debate at Yale University addressing these topics. In addition to her pornographic work, she has had several cameo appearances in mainstream films and television shows.

Career

Alexander began working in the adult industry as a stripper in Sacramento when she was 18 years old to supplement her daytime earnings as a receptionist. She started performing in adult films in 2001 beginning with a girl-girl scene. In addition to a catalog of solely girl-girl hardcore work, she appeared in a handful of softcore erotic films produced by HBO and Cinemax such as Hotel Erotica, The Sex Spa, Sex House, and Voyeur: Inside Out.

Alexander was a contract girl for Vivid Entertainment from 2004 to 2009. After years of appearing only in girl-girl scenes, she began appearing in boy-girl scenes in 2005, including an interactive DVD and a feature role with Rocco Siffredi in Vivid's Lexie and Monique Love Rocco. She was a Trophy Girl at the 2002 AVN Awards ceremony in Las Vegas.

Mainstream acting

Alexander appeared in a mainstream film entitled Spider's Web with Stephen Baldwin and Kari Wuhrer in 2002.

Alexander made a cameo appearance in the Season 3 finale of the HBO series Entourage. In 2007, she became a sports reporter on National Lampoon Comedy Radio's The Phil Show.

She also appeared in the 2009 action film Crank: High Voltage.

Advocacy
Alexander was invited to the Fox News show Red Eye w/ Greg Gutfeld to discuss a nonpartisan study that found that abstinence-only programs for teens do not work, whereas safe sex education programming was highly successful. Alexander discussed what being a Vivid Girl meant to her as well as her preference for hands-on sex education, with the segment airing on November 10, 2007. On February 15, 2008, she and Ron Jeremy represented the industry in a debate at Yale University against pornography opponents Craig Gross (founder of the XXX Church) and Donnie Pauling, a former porn producer, and the debate was aired on ABC's Nightline.

In 2017, Alexander starred in a public service campaign encouraging parents to discuss sexual health education with their children, noting that children are likely to see pornography at some point in their childhood, and need to be informed that what is portrayed in pornography is an unrealistic representation of sexual behavior.

Personal life
Alexander describes herself as "truly bisexual".

Awards

References

External links

 
 
 
 

Living people
American female erotic dancers
American erotic dancers
American female adult models
American pornographic film actresses
Bisexual pornographic film actresses
Bisexual dancers
LGBT adult models
LGBT people from California
American bisexual actors
Pornographic film actors from California
Hispanic and Latino American pornographic film actors
American people of German descent
American people of Russian descent
American people of Portuguese descent
American people of Panamanian descent
Actors from Vallejo, California
Year of birth missing (living people)
21st-century American women